Michael Janisch may refer to:

 Michael Janisch (actor) (1927–2004), Austrian actor
 Michael Janisch (musician) (born 1979), American bassist, producer and composer